Mycoplasma mycoides is a bacterial species of the genus Mycoplasma in the class Mollicutes.
This microorganism is a parasite that lives in ruminants. Mycoplasma mycoides comprises two subspecies, mycoides and capri, which infect cattle and small ruminants such as goats respectively.

Mycoplasma mycoides subsp. mycoides
The subspecies "Mycoplasma mycoides subsp. mycoides (Mmm)", previously named "Mycoplasma mycoides subsp. mycoides Small Colony (SC) type (MmmSC)", is known as the agent of contagious bovine pleuropneumonia (CBPP), a contagious lung disease of cattle. It was first isolated in 1898 by Edmond Nocard et al. and the first mycoplasma to be isolated at all.

Formerly, M. mycoides subsp. mycoides was known as Asterococcus mycoides.

The Mycoplasma mycoides cluster
Mycoplasma mycoides belongs to the Mycoplasma mycoides cluster, or Mycoplasma mycoides group, a group of closely related infectious mycoplasmas, first named by Weisburg et al.

The cluster sensu stricto contains the genera Mycoplasma mycoides and Mycoplasma capricolum and comprises six species and subspecies:

M. mycoides subsp. mycoides biotype Small Colony (MmmSC)  
M. mycoides subsp. mycoides biotype Large Colony (MmmLC)
M. mycoides subsp. capri (Mmc)
M. capricolum subsp. capricolum (Mcc)
M. capricolum subsp. capripneumoniae (Mccp)
Mycoplasma sp. 'bovine group 7' (MBG7)

The last one is disputed with respect to the question of being a separate species.

In 2009, L. Manso-Silván et al. proposed to consider M. mycoides subsp. mycoides biotype Large Colony as equal with M. mycoides subsp. capri. Furthermore, they proposed the name Mycoplasma leachii sp. nov. for Mycoplasma sp. 'bovine group 7' as a separate species.

Minimal genome project
In 2010, as part of the Minimal Genome Project, a team of the J. Craig Venter Institute synthesized a modified version (JCVI-syn1.0) of the 1,000,000 base pair M. mycoides genome and implanted it into a DNA-free bacterial shell of Mycoplasma capricolum; the resulting organism was shown to be self-replicating.

In 2016, the Venter Institute used genes from the  JCVI-syn1.0 to synthesize an even smaller genome they call JCVI-syn3.0, that contains 531,560 base pairs and 473 genes.

References

External links
Type strain of Mycoplasma mycoides at BacDive -  the Bacterial Diversity Metadatabase

Cryozoa
Bacteria described in 1929
mycoides